Kristina Viktorovna Kozhokar (born 28 February 1994) is a Russian handballer for Rostov-Don and the Russian national team.

References

External links

1994 births
Living people
Sportspeople from Tolyatti
Russian female handball players
21st-century Russian women